The Arunachal Pradesh Legislative Assembly election, 2014 took place on 9 April 2014 along with the parliamentary election 2014. The votes were counted on 16 May 2014. The election was held in the state for all 60 seats of the Arunachal Pradesh Legislative Assembly.

Results
INC won the election by winning 42 seats out of 60 and BJP won 11 seats.

!colspan=8|
|-
! colspan="2" rowspan="2" width="150" |Parties and Coalitions
! colspan="3" | Popular vote
! colspan="3" |Seats
|-
! width="70" | Vote
! width="45" | %
! width ="50"| +/-
! Contested
! Won
!+/-
|-
| style="background-color: " |
|Indian National Congress
|2,51,575
|49.50
|0.88
|60
|42
|
|-
| style="background-color:" |
|Bharatiya Janata Party
|1,57,412
|30.97
|25.76
|42
|11
|8
|-
|style="background-color: "|
|People's Party of Arunachal
|45,532
|8.96
|1.69
|16
|5
|1
|-
|style="background-color: "|
|Nationalist Congress Party
|19505
|3.84
|15.49
|9
|0
|5
|-
|style="background-color: "|
|Naga People's Front
|3,788
|0.75
|0.75
|11
|0
|
|-
|style="background-color: "|
|Aam Aadmi Party
|142
|0.03
|0.03
|1
|0
|
|-
|style="background-color:grey"|
|Independents
|24,985
|4.92
|2.77
|16
|2
|1
|-
| 
|None of the above
|5,322
|1.05
|1.05
|60
|Colspan=2 bgcolor="#E9E9E9"|
|-
| colspan="8" bgcolor="#E9E9E9"|
|- style="font-weight:bold;"
| align="left" colspan="2"| Total
| 5,08,261
| 100.00
| bgcolor="#E9E9E9"|
| 60
| 100.00
| ±0
|}
Source:

By constituency

References

State Assembly elections in Arunachal Pradesh
2010s in Arunachal Pradesh
2014 State Assembly elections in India
April 2014 events in India